Hypoproteinemia is a condition where there is an abnormally low level of protein in the blood. There are several causes that all result in edema once serum protein levels fall below a certain threshold.

Causes

 Nutritional hypoproteinemia is due to severe limitation of protein intake in the diet. An example of nutritional hypoproteinemia is Kwashiorkor, a type of protein energy malnutrition affecting young children.
 Malabsorption
 Liver disease can also cause hypoproteinemia by decreasing synthesis of plasma proteins like albumin.
 Renal disease like nephrotic syndrome can also result in hypoproteinemia because plasma proteins are lost in the urine.
 Sepsis (whole body infection) – macrophages activated in the liver and spleen secrete TNF-alpha into the bloodstream resulting in hypoproteinemia.

Pathophysiology

Decreased serum protein reduces the oncotic pressure of the blood, leading to loss of fluid from the intravascular compartment, or the blood vessels, to the interstitial tissues, resulting in edema. This is termed as hypoproteinemia.

Diagnosis
Hypoproteinemia is often confirmed by testing for serum albumin and total protein levels.

References

External links 

Abnormal clinical and laboratory findings for blood